Ghost of a Tale is an independent action role-playing stealth game developed primarily by game designer and DreamWorks and Universal Pictures veteran Lionel "Seith" Gallat. The title was funded by a successful Indiegogo crowd-funding campaign which ran from April–May 2013, raising 48,700. An early version was released in 2016 on Windows PCs and the Xbox One as part of Microsoft's ID@Xbox indie developer program. The final PC version was released on March 13, 2018. On February 16, 2019, it was announced that the release date of the PlayStation 4 and Xbox One versions would be March 12, 2019.
The game was  released for the Nintendo Switch on October 8, 2020. A version for Amazon Luna was released on October 20, 2020.

Set in a dark fantasy medieval world, players control Tilo, a small mouse minstrel, who must make his way through dungeons and lands full of danger while uncovering mysteries of the past, all the while he is determined to find his wife Merra and finding a way to escape the prison.

Gameplay
    An “avoid your enemies” game. Common general idea with the Thief games, or the Styx games, but here you neither have weapons as a last resort, nor can you attack from behind. You can incapacitate (preferably unaware) enemies temporarily, by throwing bottles at their heads, but it is difficult. If spotted, it’s easier to outrun them and hide. There are many hiding spots in the game (barrels, chests), and you can save the game only when you are in one of them. These are everywhere (you just have to reach one) and there are also auto-saves after dialogues with NPCs. The enemies don’t search in hiding spots to root you out.
    Another major aspect of gameplay consists of costumes (disguises). According to the lore of the game, and since all mice look identical, their clothing in different occasions is the means by which they can be told apart. As you find your way in the game’s areas and search out, you can find separate pieces of clothing, and if you collect all pieces (usually five) that consist a costume, you can wear it and trick others. For example, you can pass as a guard among other guards, and you can solve quests, not solvable otherwise.
    An also important aspect is that as each area is explored, shortcuts can be discovered in each area’s locations, which are very useful, as they connect the area’s locations (instead of having to go by the long route).
    There is a main questline and side quests. You can accumulate xps by solving quests and find some collectables (e.g. gather roses, burn the Rat Guard flags) and you level-up, but you can’t affect anything in leveling-up. The only important thing is to feed, as the length of the health bar is also used as stamina, and it is badly needed when spotted by an enemy and you need to hastily get away from him. Also, you can learn skills from NPCs, after you do some quests for them. There are 10 skills in the game.

Synopsis
Ghost of a Tale takes place in a medieval world inhabited by several species of anthropomorphic animals, many of which inhabit their own kingdom: the lore includes mice, rats, frogs, crabs, badgers, hawks, spiders, leeches, magpies and various undead creatures.

The game is set centuries after a cataclysmic event known as the War of the Green Flame. During this time, a mysterious ball of emerald fire of unknown origin swept across the world, killing all who stood against it and raising their bodies into an ever-growing undead army. At the height of the conflict, the mouse kingdom sent an envoy to the flame attempting to save their home by revealing the weaknesses of others, but the being could not be reasoned with and destroyed most of their land regardless.

In the end, it was the rat army who rose up to finally defeat the entity becoming the heroes of the war and expelled the mice from the land's governing body forever for their treachery. Hundreds of years later the exact history of these events has become clouded in time with the only true account being held in the oral traditions of a group of magpies called the Truth Sayers who live in a tower on an ancient island.

At the beginning of the game, Tilo has been thrown into a dungeon by rats: he must escape from his prison and the surrounding lands. The many adversaries Tilo faces are much stronger than him: the courageous little mouse will need to be smart, stealthy and agile to succeed!

Development
Ghost of a Tale is mostly a one-man project by Lionel Gallat, a veteran DreamWorks and Universal Pictures animator and animation director who worked on films such as The Prince of Egypt, The Road to El Dorado and Shark Tale, with the occasional help of friends on certain aspects of the development. Gallat began work on the game shortly after finishing production on the 2012 film The Lorax, and showed the first alpha footage in April 2013 after nearly a year of progress, which coincided with the launch of the game's Indiegogo campaign to raise funds to further development. By the end of the campaign in May, he managed to reach his goal of €45,000 after a one-week extension, earning a total of €48,700.

Gallat was inspired by films such as The Secret of NIMH, The Dark Crystal and Disney's Robin Hood as well as the Redwall book series and the fantasy drawings of Alan Lee, John Howe and Paul Bonner. Video games such as the Legend of Zelda series, Dark Souls, and Ico also influenced the title, with Gallat stating that "I'm really trying to recapture the sense of wonder I felt as a kid when I discovered the games from the 80s and early 90s. But with an AAA quality (as far as I'm able) that's very much up-to-date."

Gallat originally began work on the game in CryEngine but found that engine too difficult to use and so switched the project to Unity. Although Ghost of a Tale was designed to be "primarily a PC title" Microsoft expressed interest in the project and invited the team to release the game on the Xbox One as part of their ID@Xbox program which allows independent developers to self-publish games on their system. A trailer for the game was shown at the 2014 Gamescom expo in Germany, along with a fully playable demo. Ghost of a Tale was originally expected to launch on Windows PCs and the Xbox One in 2016 before being delayed. An early access version was instead released on Steam in July 2016, with an Xbox Game Preview version was released for Xbox One in June 2017. As of June 2017, Gallat estimated that the game was 45 percent complete. In February 2018, Gallat announced that the Windows version's final release date would be on March 13, 2018, with the Xbox One and PlayStation 4 versions planned for release by the end of the year.

Reception

Reviews 
Ghost of a Tale has received generally favourable reviews, according to video game review aggregator Metacritic. The game's Metacritic score currently stands at 75% based on twenty-two reviews.

Awards

References

External links

2018 video games
Action role-playing video games
Crowdfunded video games
Dark fantasy video games
Dystopian video games
Early access video games
Fantasy video games set in the Middle Ages
Fraud in fiction
Indie video games
Indiegogo projects
Mystery adventure games
Nintendo Switch games
PlayStation 4 games
Single-player video games
Stealth video games
Theft in fiction
Video games about crime
Video games about curses
Video games about mice and rats
Video games developed in France
Video games set in castles
Windows games
Works about missing people
Works about rebels
Works about singers
Xbox One games